El Salvador's approximately 6.2 million inhabitants are mostly Christian. Evangelical Protestantism is experiencing rapid growth in recent decades while the Catholic share of the population is on decline.

El Salvador is a secular country and the freedom of religion is enshrined in the nation's constitution. However, the constitution grants automatic official recognition to the Roman Catholic Church and requires other religious groups to apply for official recognition through registration.

Religious affiliation 

According to a CID-Gallup Survey, on May 2001, around 61% of population was Catholic, 28% Protestant, 9% non religious and 2% others. Ten years after, by 2011, changed at 47%, 36% and 15% respectively.  

There is some debate about percentages, the Institute of Public Opinion of the University of Central America in May 2017 found 47.5% of the population as Roman Catholics, and 35.1% as Protestant, 14.5% as not having a religion and the remainder (about  3%) being  Jehovah's Witnesses, International Society of Krishna Consciousness, Muslims, Jews, Baháʼís, Buddhists, Latter-day Saints (Mormons), and members of indigenous religions.  However, Latinobarómetro in 2017 found 39% were Catholic, 28% Protestant, 30% atheist/agnostic/not religious, 2% other religions, and 1% did not answer.  It also found in 1996 that 67% of the population considered themselves Catholic and 15% Protestant.

According to World Religion Database 2020, 2.57% is non-religious (atheist or agnostic).

Protestant denominations 
Mision Cristiana Elim Internacional is a large pentecostal denomination started in El Salvador.  It claims that its main church in San Salvador has 120,000 attending.  The Assemblies of God claim 285,226 members (2007).

The Mormons claim 120,317 people in 164 congregations and 1 temple (2015) which if correct would be just under 2% of the population.  An IUDOP study in 2009 found that Mormons were 2% of the Protestants they surveyed or about .8% of the total population. They started evangelizing in El Salvador in 1951.

The Anglican Church in El Salvador (a diocese of the province of the Anglican Church in Central America) claims 6,000 members in 18 congregations.  The Baptist Association of El Salvador claims 4,427 members and the Salvadorean Lutheran Synod about 15,000 in 68 congregations.

Religious freedom
The constitution of El Salvador provides for the freedom of religion and prohibits religious discrimination. Publicly offending others' religious beliefs or damaging religious objects is punishable by imprisonment. Members of the clergy may not hold senior government positions, and are forbidden from joining political parties.

Religious groups may register with the government for the purposes of tax-exemption and acquiring building permits. Special visas are required for individuals who wish to travel to El Salvador to engage in proselytizing.

Public school education is secular. Private schools may include religious content in their curricula, but do not receive government support.

Since 2016, clergy have limited access to prisons, due to concerns that some members of the clergy were using prison visits to smuggle items into prisons.

Churches of El Salvador

See also
 Demographics of El Salvador
 Roman Catholicism in El Salvador
 The Church of Jesus Christ of Latter-day Saints in El Salvador
 Islam in El Salvador
 Judaism in El Salvador

References

CIA.gov

Further reading
 Stephen Offutt, New Centers of Global Evangelicalism in Latin America and Africa (Cambridge University Press, 2015) focuses on El Salvador and South Africa. online review

External links